Gareth Davis (born May 1950) is a British businessman.

Appointed by Lord Hanson, he was the CEO of Imperial Tobacco, the world's 4th largest international cigarette company, from 1996 until May 2010.

He is the chairman of Wolseley plc, DS Smith, and has previously served as chairman of William Hill.

References

1950 births
Bookmakers
British businesspeople
Living people